Valler videregående skole (The Valler Upper Secondary School) is an upper secondary school located in Sandvika near Oslo, Norway.

The school's motto is the Norwegian phrase Hjerte og ånd, vilje og ansvar ("Heart and spirit, will and responsibility").

History
The school dates back to 1888 and was established under the name Bærum Middelskole. The classes were taught at Valler farm during the first years, but was later moved to Sandvika. In 1939 the school moved to its current location, and the building was expanded in 1998.

Programs
Valler Upper Secondary School offers one program, namely study specialized education programs. Within the program, students may specialize in three subprograms: science, language and social science, and visual arts.

Notable alumni
 Paul Chaffey (1965-) – politician
 Harald Eia (1966-) – comedian
 Eirik Grude Flekkøy (1963-) – professor of physics
 Unni Lindell (1957-) – author
Andreas "Tix" Haukeland (1993-) – musician

Notable teachers
 Simen Agdestein (1967-) – chess grandmaster and retired footballer
 Jostein Gaarder (1952-) – author
 Borghild Tenden (1951-) – politician
 Brage Sandmoen (1967-) – football referee

References

Sandvika
Education in Bærum
Educational institutions established in 1888
1888 establishments in Norway
Secondary schools in Norway
Akershus County Municipality